Svend Jørgen Gerner Andresen (born 20 May 1950) is a Danish former association football player, who played 29 games for the Denmark national football team from 1970 to 1975, and represented Denmark at the 1972 Summer Olympics. Born in Østerbro, Andresen played as a defender for B 1903, before he moved abroad and played 48 games for Eintracht Trier in the German 2nd Bundesliga from 1976 to 1978. He also played 11 games for the Denmark national under-21 football team.

References

1950 births
Living people
Danish men's footballers
Denmark international footballers
Denmark under-21 international footballers
Footballers at the 1972 Summer Olympics
Olympic footballers of Denmark
SV Eintracht Trier 05 players
Expatriate footballers in Germany
Association football defenders
Footballers from Copenhagen